Brigitte is a French indie folk musical duo formed in 2008 by Sylvie Hoarau (the brunette) and Aurélie Saada (the blonde). Their 2011 debut full-length album Et vous, tu m'aimes ?, went platinum in France. It is sold through both French and the U.S. iTunes Store.

On February 8, 2021, Saada said in an Instagram post that the duo had separated.

Naming
Brigitte is a take on famous Brigittes of yore, such as Brigitte Bardot; in an interview, one of them said:  (Brigitte is retro, our style it's the 50s, it's French, it's Brigitte Bardot, it's Brigitte Lahaie, the aunt that cooks, the cousin's wife. Brigitte is the woman in plural)

In popular culture
English version of "Oh la la" was used for a Lancôme advertisement.
"La Poudrière" was used as soundtrack for a short directed by Aurélie Saada for Vogue Eyewear.

Discography

Albums

EPs

Singles

*Did not appear in the official Belgian Ultratop 50 charts, but rather in the bubbling under Ultratip charts.

Covers
 "Ma Benz" by NTM
 "Rockin' Robin" by Michael Jackson
 "Concerto pour une Voix" by Saint Preux
 "Walk This Way" by Aerosmith and Run–D.M.C.
 "Allumer le feu" by Johnny Hallyday
 "Les Vacances au bord de la mer" by Michel Jonasz (Soundtrack of Thelma, Louise et Chantal)
 "Eye of the Tiger" by Survivor
 "Chez les Yéyés" by Serge Gainsbourg on France Inter - March 2011
 "I Want Your Sex" by George Michael on Taratata fête la Musique - 2011-06-21
 "L'amour est un oiseau rebelle", by Carmen for the ad Bledina - July 2011
 "The Bay" by Metronomy

References

French musical duos
French folk music groups
Female musical duos